is the second album from the J-pop group Melon Kinenbi, containing five of their singles, released on December 1, 2004. Since Tsunku was inactive at the time, it was produced by the other members of Sharam Q instead. Its highest ranking on the Oricon weekly chart was #28, and it charted for two weeks.

Track listing

References

External links 
 The Nimaime entry on the Up-Front Works official website

2004 albums
Melon Kinenbi albums
Zetima albums